The Punta Gorda Woman's Club is a historic woman's club in Punta Gorda, Florida, United States. It is located at 118 Sullivan Street, and at one point was the area's first community library. Tt was added to the National Register of Historic Places in 1991.

The building is owned by the Punta Gorda Historical Society.

References

External links

 Charlotte County listings at National Register of Historic Places
 Florida's Office of Cultural and Historical Programs
 Charlotte County listings
 Punta Gorda Woman's Club
 Punta Gorda Woman's Club - Punta Gorda Historical Society

Libraries in Florida
Punta Gorda, Florida
National Register of Historic Places in Charlotte County, Florida
Women's clubs in Florida
Women's club buildings in Florida
1925 establishments in Florida
Buildings and structures completed in 1925